Vanessa Madeline Angel (born 10 November 1966) is an English actress and former model. She played the role of Lisa on the television series Weird Science. She is also known for her role as Claudia in the film Kingpin.

Early life 
Angel, who has said this is her birth name and not a stage name, was born 10 November 1966 in London, the daughter of Elizabeth and Peter Angel, a stockbroker. She was discovered by a model-management agent in a London cafe as a teenager. At 16, she was signed by Ford Models and moved to New York City. During her modelling stint, Angel appeared on the covers of Vogue and Cosmopolitan. She was also contracted as the Diet Pepsi Girl.

Career 
Angel's first film role was in the 1985 American comedy Spies Like Us, in which she played a soldier in the Soviet Strategic Missile Forces who sleeps with Dan Aykroyd's character; she also appears in the accompanying Paul McCartney video. In 1990, she appeared in a small role in the film King of New York. Angel continued to appear in films throughout the early 1990s. After a leading guest-spot on TV's The Equalizer, she played the recurring roles of Megan on Baywatch and Detective Peggy Elliott on Reasonable Doubts. She guest-starred in two episodes of Melrose Place, playing what she described as "this crazy, drugged out, bisexual supermodel who kissed [the character played by] Daphne Zuniga!"

From 1994 to 1998, she starred in the television series Weird Science as Lisa, the computer-generated genie role originated by Kelly LeBrock in the 1985 film upon which the series is based. In 1995, Angel was cast in the role of Xena, a guest spot on Hercules: The Legendary Journeys, but due to an illness was unable to take the role, which eventually went to Lucy Lawless.

During the series run of Weird Science, Angel landed the female lead in the Farrelly brothers film, Kingpin. She played roles in Kissing a Fool with David Schwimmer, followed by a role in the 1999 film Made Men. In 2004, she appeared in SuperBabies: Baby Geniuses 2, as Scott Baio's wife. Angel has also had roles in the Sci-Fi Pictures Original telefilm Sabretooth (2002) and The Perfect Score (2004).

In 2000, she guest starred in three episodes of the Sci-Fi Channel's Stargate SG-1, playing Anise, a Tok'ra archaeologist/scientist whose host is named Freya. Her first appearance is in the season-four episode "Upgrades", and she appeared in the two following episodes, "Crossroads" and "Divide and Conquer". In 2005, Angel played herself in the season-two episode of Entourage entitled "I Love You Too". In 2007, she completed the independent film Blind Ambition, and later appeared in the Farrellys' Hall Pass. She played a guest role as Alison in the fifth season of  Californication.

Angel started a clothing line in 2009, VANE LA.

On 15 October 2014, Angel appeared on Ken Reid's podcast TV Guidance Counselor.

Filmography

Film

Television and web

References

Further reading

External links 

 
 

1966 births
Actresses from London
English expatriates in the United States
English female models
English film actresses
English television actresses
Living people
Actresses from New York City
20th-century English actresses
21st-century English actresses